The Sixth Floor Museum at Dealey Plaza is a museum located on the sixth floor of the Dallas County Administration Building (formerly the Texas School Book Depository) in downtown Dallas, Texas, overlooking Dealey Plaza at the intersection of Elm and Houston Streets. The museum examines the life, times, death, and legacy of United States President John F. Kennedy and the life of Lee Harvey Oswald as well as the various conspiracy theories surrounding the assassination. 

The museum's exhibition area uses historic films, photographs, artifacts, and interpretive displays to document the events of the assassination, the reports by government investigations that followed, and the historical legacy of the tragedy. The museum is self-sufficient in funding, relying solely on donations and ticket sales. It rents the space from the County of Dallas.

The museum was founded by the Dallas County Historical Foundation. It opened on Presidents' Day, February 20, 1989.

A museum webcam features a live view from the sixth floor sniper's nest. It is not meant to glorify the shooting in any way.

In December 1999, the Zapruder family donated the copyright to the Zapruder film to The Sixth Floor Museum, along with one of the first-generation copies made on November 22, 1963, and other copies of the film. The Zapruder family no longer retains any copyrights to the film, which are now controlled entirely by the museum. The original camera negative, however, is in possession of the National Archives and Records Administration.

On February 19, 2007, the previously unreleased 8 mm film footage of Kennedy's motorcade, donated to the museum by George Jefferies and his son-in-law, was shown publicly for the first time. The 40-second film, silent and in color, showed the motorcade before the assassination, as well as part of Dealey Plaza the following day.

The Jefferies film was described as capturing "a beaming Jacqueline Kennedy," as well as showing Kennedy's suit jacket bunched-up in the back at that moment, about two minutes before Kennedy entered Dealey Plaza.

References

Further reading

External links 
 
 live webcam, EarthCam, from the southeast corner window of the sixth floor in the former Texas School Book Depository

Museums in Dallas
Buildings and structures associated with the assassination of John F. Kennedy
History museums in Texas
Museums established in 1989
Monuments and memorials to John F. Kennedy in the United States
Presidential museums in Texas
1989 establishments in Texas